Machakhela National Park is a national park in Adjara, in the valley of Machakhlistskali, Georgia. The park was established in 2012 with an area of 8733 ha.

Machakhela National Park provides for the preservation of unique biological and landscape biodiversity, the long-term protection of ecosystem of Colchic forests, ecological safety and natural and environmental tourism and recreational activities.

Tourist attractions 
Machakhela National Park region features ruins of fortresses in historic region of Machakheli, arch bridges and wine presses. From the slopes of Mtavarangelozi mountain there are views of Batumi and Machakhela gorge. Park visitor center is located in village Acharisagmarti, Khelvachauri Municipality.

See also 
List of protected areas of Georgia
Euxine-Colchic deciduous forests
Machakheli

References

National parks of Georgia (country)
Protected areas established in 2012